The Championship Stage of the 2008–09 Libyan second division football competition will consist of a mini league of 8 teams, who play each other twice to decide the two clubs who will be promoted to the Libyan Premier League for the 2009–10 season. The top two teams in each group of the regular season will compete in this stage of the competition.

The draw for the Championship Stage took place on May 27, 2009, at 11:00 EET

Participating teams
Group A
Mahalla (champions)
Urouba (runners-up)
Group B
Dhahra Tripoli (champions)
Al Tala'e (runners-up)
Group C
Darnes (champions)
Najma (runners-up)
Group D
Tahaddi (champions)
Nojom Ajdabiya (runners-up)

League table

Fixtures and results
All times local (EET)

Round 1
Fixtures announced May 27, 2009All other fixture dates announced on June 1, 2009, times TBC

Round 2
Fixtures announced June 7, 2009

Round 3
Fixtures announced June 7, 2009

Round 4

Round 5

Round 6

Round 7

Round 8

Round 9

Round 10

Round 11

Round 12

Round 13

Round 14

References

1